Norman Harry Clarke (31 July 189218 February 1974) was a British Anglican bishop who served as the third Bishop of Plymouth from 1950 to 1962 and, simultaneously, as the Archdeacon of Plymouth.

Clarke was born in Sheffield and educated at Sheffield University,. He was made deacon on Trinity Sunday 1916 (18 June) and ordained priest the next Trinity Sunday (3 June 1917) — both times by Leonard Burrows, Bishop of Sheffield, at Sheffield Cathedral. He was a Diocesan Inspector of Schools, then a  residential canon at Southwark Cathedral and finally (before his ordination to the episcopate) Vicar of St Andrew’s, Plymouth. He was consecrated a bishop on St James's Day 1950 (25 July) by Geoffrey Fisher, Archbishop of Canterbury, at St Paul's Cathedral.

References

1892 births
Clergy from Sheffield
Alumni of the University of Sheffield
20th-century Church of England bishops
Anglican bishops of Plymouth
1974 deaths